Ivan Sabanov (born 25 June 1992) is a Serbian tennis player who formerly represented Croatia. He has won one ATP doubles title and 28 ITF doubles titles. Sabanov has a career high ATP singles ranking of World No. 907 achieved on 25 August 2014. He also has a career high ATP doubles ranking of World No. 77 achieved on 11 April 2022.

Professional career
Sabanov made his ATP main draw debut at the 2018 Croatia Open Umag in the doubles draw partnering his twin brother Matej.

His best career performance came in 2021 when he won his first ATP doubles title by winning Serbia Open with his brother Matej. They defeated Gonzalo Escobar and Ariel Behar in the final.

ATP career finals

Doubles: 2 (1 title, 1 runners-up)

ATP Challenger and ITF Futures Finals

Doubles: 66 (30–36)

References

External links

1992 births
Living people
Serbian male tennis players
Sportspeople from Subotica
Sportspeople from Osijek
Croats of Vojvodina
Croatian male tennis players